Aulacothorax recticollis is a species of flea beetle in the family Chrysomelidae, formerly in the genus Orthaltica. It is found in Central America and North America.

References

Alticini
Articles created by Qbugbot
Beetles described in 1861
Taxa named by John Lawrence LeConte